The 1927 Manitoba general election was held on 28 June 1927 to elect Members of the Legislative Assembly of the Province of Manitoba, Canada. The result was a second consecutive victory for Manitoba farmers, following its 1922 win.

This was the first election in Manitoba history to elect MLAs through casting of ranked ballots in all districts. Ten MLAs were elected in Winnipeg through Single transferable vote, as they had done since 1920. The other districts now began to elect MLAs through Instant-runoff voting.

The result was a second consecutive victory for the Progressive Party of Manitoba, which was supported by the United Farmers of Manitoba. The Progressives, led by Premier John Bracken, won twenty-nine seats out of fifty-five to win their second majority government. During the campaign, the Progressives stressed that they were not a party in the traditional sense and promised "A business (not a party) government". Many Progressive candidates simply described themselves as Bracken supporters.

The Conservatives won fifteen seats under the leadership of Fawcett Taylor, an improvement from seven in the election of 1922. This election re-established the Conservatives as the leading opposition party in Manitoba, and made the party a credible challenger for government in the next election.

The Manitoba Liberal Party was unable to regain the support it had lost to the Progressive Party in the previous election. The Liberals won seven seats under the new leadership of Hugh Robson, down one from their 1922 total. After the election, many senior Liberals began to work for an electoral alliance with the Progressives. Robson, who opposed this plan, was persuaded to resign as leader in 1930. The alliance was formalized in 1932.

The Independent Labour Party fell to three seats, down from six in the previous election.  All three members, including party leader John Queen, were elected in the city of Winnipeg.

Independent candidate John Edmison was also re-elected in Brandon.  

Jacob Penner ran in Winnipeg as a Communist candidate, but was not successful.

The proportion of the vote received by the Progressive Party (based on first-preference votes) was enough to assure a functioning government, but it was one of lowest in Canadian history.

The Legislature experienced a significant turnover of members, with 23 seats electing new MLAs. Twelve incumbents (one in Winnipeg, and 11 more in other ridings) went down in defeat, six failed to be renominated, and five chose not to stand for reelection.

Under the instant-runoff voting used to elect 45 MLAs, the leader in the first count of the district's votes was the one elected in all but three districts,so the final results in the districts outside Winnipeg were almost the same as under First-past-the-post voting .

Of the 45 single-member ridings, 21 were decided solely on first-preference votes, two MLAs were returned by acclamation, and the remainder went to runoff counts. Seventeen single-member ridings changed allegiance from the previous election: in addition to the 11 rural incumbents defeated, three more changed allegiance, and three open seats flipped to another party. There were only three turn-overs - in Minnedosa,  Morden & Rhineland and Springfield. Of the three, the Conservatives won two and the Liberals gained one.

Results

Results by riding
Bold names indicate members returned by acclamation. Incumbents are marked with *.

Seats changing hands
In the single-member ridings, 17 seats changed allegiance:

 Progressive to Conservative
 Killarney
 Manitou
 Minnedosa

 Progressive to Liberal
 Mountain
 Springfield

 Progressive to Independent-Farmer
 Ethelbert

 Progressive to Independent-Progressive
 Iberville
 Rupertsland

 Liberal to Progressive
 Fairford
 Gimli

 Liberal to Conservative
 Dauphin

 ILP to Conservative
 Assiniboia
 Kildonan & St. Andrews

 Independent to Progressive
 St. Clements
 Ste. Rose

 Independent to Conservative
 St. Boniface

 Independent-Farmer to Progressive
 Emerson

(Italics indicate that incumbent changed allegiance)

In Winnipeg, the seat distribution was changed as follows:

Turnovers on runoff

In the single-member ridings, there were three cases where the first-place candidate on first-preference votes failed to win:

|-
! rowspan="2" colspan="2"|Party
! rowspan="2"|Candidate
! colspan="2"|First-preference votes
! colspan="3"|Maximum votes
|- style="text-align:right; background-color:#E9E9E9; text-align:center"
! Votes
! % 
! Votes
! Round
! Initial vs transfer votes mix

| style="text-align:left;" |Norman W.P. Shuttleworth
| 1,405
| 41.89
| 1,581
| 2
| style="text-align:left;" |

| style="text-align:left;" |George Compton
| 1,377
| 41.06
| 1,595
| 2
| style="text-align:left;" |

| style="text-align:left;" |Walter Cooper Richardson
| 572
| 17.05
| 572
| 1
| style="text-align:left;" |
|-
| colspan="3" style="text-align:left;" |Total
|3,354
|100.00
|colspan="3"|  
|-
| colspan="5" style="text-align:left;" |Exhausted votes
|178
|5.31%
| style="text-align:left;" |
|}

|-
! rowspan="2" colspan="2"|Party
! rowspan="2"|Candidate
! colspan="2"|First-preference votes
! colspan="3"|Maximum votes
|- style="text-align:right; background-color:#E9E9E9; text-align:center"
! Votes
! % 
! Votes
! Round
! Initial vs transfer votes mix

| style="text-align:left;" |John Henry Black
| 1,075
| 41.20
| 1,132
| 2
| style="text-align:left;" |

| style="text-align:left;" |Hugh McGavin
| 1,016
| 38.94
| 1,252
| 2
| style="text-align:left;" |

| style="text-align:left;" |Peter Buerckert
| 518
| 19.85
| 518
| 1
| style="text-align:left;" |
|-
| colspan="3" style="text-align:left;" |Total
|2,609
|100.00
|colspan="3"|  
|-
| colspan="5" style="text-align:left;" |Exhausted votes
|225
|8.62%
| style="text-align:left;" |
|}

|-
! rowspan="2" colspan="2"|Party
! rowspan="2"|Candidate
! colspan="2"|First-preference votes
! colspan="3"|Maximum votes
|- style="text-align:right; background-color:#E9E9E9; text-align:center"
! Votes
! % 
! Votes
! Round
! Initial vs transfer votes mix

| style="text-align:left;" |Clifford Barclay
| 1,459
| 43.70
| 1,489
| 2
| style="text-align:left;" |

| style="text-align:left;" |Murdoch Mackay
| 1,389
| 41.60
| 1,507
| 2
| style="text-align:left;" |

| style="text-align:left;" |Theo Stefanik
| 491
| 14.70
| 491
| 1
| style="text-align:left;" |
|-
| colspan="3" style="text-align:left;" |Total
|3,339
|100.00
|colspan="3"|  
|-
| colspan="5" style="text-align:left;" |Exhausted votes
|343
|10.27%
| style="text-align:left;" |
|}

First-preference votes by riding

 = won on first-preference votes

Winnipeg

Eligible voters 67,124      Valid votes 50,706      Turnout: 76%

10 seats.     Quota: 4,610

|-
! rowspan="2" colspan="2"|Party
! rowspan="2"|Candidate
! colspan="2"|First-preference votes
! colspan="3"|Maximum votes
|- style="text-align:right; background-color:#E9E9E9; text-align:center"
! Votes
! % 
! Votes
! Round
! Initial vs transfer votes mix

| style="text-align:left;" |John Thomas Haig*
| 5,108
| 10.07
| 5,108
| 1
| style="text-align:left;" |

| style="text-align:left;" |Hugh Robson
| 4,862
| 9.59
| 4,862
| 1
| style="text-align:left;" |

| style="text-align:left;" |William Sanford Evans*
| 4,551
| 8.98
| 4,800
| 3
| style="text-align:left;" |

| style="text-align:left;" |Independent Labour
| style="text-align:left;" |John Queen*
| 3,985
| 7.86
| 4,631
| 9
| style="text-align:left;" |

| style="text-align:left;" |William Major
| 3,713
| 7.32
| 5,142
| 14
| style="text-align:left;" |

| style="text-align:left;" |Independent Labour
| style="text-align:left;" |Seymour Farmer*
| 3,497
| 6.90
| 5,376
| 13
| style="text-align:left;" |

| style="text-align:left;" |Edward Montgomery
| 2,236
| 4.41
| 3,960
| 22
| style="text-align:left;" |

| style="text-align:left;" |John K. Downes*
| 2,047
| 4.04
| 3,411
| 21
| style="text-align:left;" |

| style="text-align:left;" |Jacob Penner
| 2,015
| 3.97
| 2,229
| 19
| style="text-align:left;" |

| style="text-align:left;" |William Tobias
| 1,687
| 3.33
| 4,114
| 22
| style="text-align:left;" |

| style="text-align:left;" |Royal Burritt
| 1,604
| 3.16
| 1,791
| 16
| style="text-align:left;" |

| style="text-align:left;" |Edith Rogers*
| 1,582
| 3.12
| 4,764
| 21
| style="text-align:left;" |

| style="text-align:left;" |Independent Labour
| style="text-align:left;" |William Ivens*
| 1,435
| 2.83
| 4,700
| 21
| style="text-align:left;" |

| style="text-align:left;" |W.J. Lindal
| 1,362
| 2.69
| 1,669
| 13
| style="text-align:left;" |

| style="text-align:left;" |Duncan Cameron
| 1,271
| 2.51
| 2,173
| 18
| style="text-align:left;" |

| style="text-align:left;" |Max Steinkopf
| 1,241
| 2.45
| 1,291
| 10
| style="text-align:left;" |

| style="text-align:left;" |Ralph Maybank
| 1,191
| 2.35
| 1,410
| 11
| style="text-align:left;" |

| style="text-align:left;" |Arthur Moore
| 1,153
| 2.27
| 1,218
| 9
| style="text-align:left;" |

| style="text-align:left;" |Theodore A. Hunt
| 1,075
| 2.12
| 2,408
| 20
| style="text-align:left;" |

| style="text-align:left;" |Independent Labour
| style="text-align:left;" |Sam Cartwright
| 999
| 1.97
| 1,049
| 7
| style="text-align:left;" |

| style="text-align:left;" |Independent Labour
| style="text-align:left;" |R. Durward
| 993
| 1.96
| 1,691
| 14
| style="text-align:left;" |

| style="text-align:left;" |R.A. Gillespie
| 941
| 1.86
| 1,116
| 8
| style="text-align:left;" |

| style="text-align:left;" |F. Sedziak
| 836
| 1.65
| 842
| 6
| style="text-align:left;" |

| style="text-align:left;" |J. MacLean
| 761
| 1.50
| 792
| 5
| style="text-align:left;" |

| style="text-align:left;" |Independent Labour
| style="text-align:left;" |W.A. James
| 561
| 1.11
| 562
| 4
| style="text-align:left;" |
|-
| colspan="3" style="text-align:left;" |Total
|50,706
|100.00
|colspan="3"|  
|-
| colspan="5" style="text-align:left;" |Exhausted votes
|5,508
|10.86%
| style="text-align:left;" |
|}

Sources

The first ballot results for Winnipeg and results for all other constituencies are taken from an official Manitoba government publication entitled "Manitoba elections, 1920–1941", cross-referenced with the 1928 Canadian Parliamentary Guide, and an appendix to the Manitoba government's report of the 2003 provincial election.

All ballot results for Winnipeg after the first count are taken from reports in the Winnipeg Free Press newspaper. It is possible that some errors appeared in the original publication.

Post-election changes

Birtle (John Pratt leaves the government side, early in the parliament).

Lansdowne (res. Tobias Norris, 1928), 10 November 1928:
Donald McKenzie (Liberal/Progressive) 1527
Harvey Hicks (C) 1260

Morris (William Clubb to new cabinet post, 18 May 1929), 30 May 1929:
William Clubb (P) accl.

Turtle Mountain (dec. Richard G. Willis, February 1929), 22 June 1929:
Alexander Welch (C) 1327
W.E. Campbell (P) 995

Winnipeg (res. Hugh Robson, January 1930)

Mountain (dec. Irving Cleghorn, 1930), 20 January 1930:
Ivan Schultz (L [endorsed by Progressives]) accl.

The Liberals formed an alliance with the governing Progressives in 1932.

Brandon City (dec. John H. Edmison, 22 March 1932)

References

Further reading
 

1927 elections in Canada
1927
1927 in Manitoba
June 1927 events